Deepti Sati is an Indian actress and model who predominantly appears in Malayalam films. She has also appeared in Marathi, Kannada, Tamil and Telugu films. She made her acting debut in 2015 with Nee-Na.

Deepti went onto star in film including Jaguar, Solo, Luckee and Driving Licence. She made her web debut with Pearlish in 2019 and has also been judge on television shows.

Early life
Deepti Sati was born in Mumbai. Her father, Divyesh Sati, hails from Nainital, Uttarakhand while her mother Madhuri Sati, is a native of Kochi, Kerala.

Deepti Sati did her schooling from Canossa Convent High School, Andheri (E), Mumbai and pursued her bachelor's degree in business administration from the St. Xavier's College, Mumbai.

Beauty pageants
 Impresario Miss Kerala in 2012
 Navy Queen in 2013 
 Indian Princess in 2014 – First Runner-up 
 Femina Miss India 2014 – Miss Talented 2014 & Miss Iron Maiden 2014.

Career
Deepti Sati started her modelling career with a pageant called Pantaloon Fresh Face Hunt. Deepti Sati won the Impresario Miss Kerala 2012 title. She was one among the top ten finalists of Femina Miss India 2014 and was also awarded the titles Miss. Talented 2014 & Miss. Iron Maiden 2014. She also won the title Navy Queen 2013 and was the first runner up in the pageant Indian Princess 2013. Deepti Sati is a trained dancer in the Indian classical dance form called Kathak as well as Bharatanatyam and has undergone training since she was three years old.

Deepti Sati made her acting debut alongside Vijay Babu and Ann Augustine in the 2015 Malayalam movie Nee-Na, directed by Lal Jose, in which she played the title character as a creative director of an ad company. She impressed the audience with her powerful tomboyish character.

Filmography

Films

Television

Web series

Music video

Awards and nominations

References

External links

 
 

Living people
Indian beauty pageant winners
Female models from Mumbai
Indian film actresses
Actresses in Malayalam cinema
21st-century Indian actresses
Actresses from Mumbai
St. Xavier's College, Mumbai alumni
Actresses in Telugu cinema
Actresses in Kannada cinema
Actresses in Tamil cinema
Year of birth missing (living people)